The film industry in Albania comprises the art of films and movies made within the country or by Albanian directors abroad. Albania has had an active cinema industry since 1897 and began strong activities in 1940 after the foundation of both the "Kinostudio Shqipëria e Re" and National Center of Cinematography in Tirana.

Early Albanian films were introduced in Albania in 1909 by painter and photographer Kolë Idromeno in Shkodër. Afterwards, the first public screening of foreign films took place over the years.

The motion pictures have won international and prestigious awards and each year new Albanian films are seen at film festivals around the globe.

In consideration to the Albanian diaspora, there are several internationally renowned actors such as the Albanian-Americans Eliza Dushku, Klement Tinaj, Masiela Lusha, Jim and John Belushi, Kosovo-Albanians Bekim Fehmiu and Arta Dobroshi, Greek-Albanian Irene Papas and Turkish-Albanian Barish Arduç.

Albania annually hosts several International Film Festivals. The most important is certainly the Tirana International Film Festival, which takes place in the capital of Tirana. Born in 2008, the Durrës International Film Festival is also among the most prominent exhibitions held in summer at the Amphitheatre of Durrës.

Notable Albanian Films

See also 

 List of Albanian films by year 
 Cinema of Kosovo 
 Cinema of North Macedonia 
 Albanian Central Film Archive
 National Center of Cinematography (Albania)

External links 
 Central State's Film Archive
 National Center of Cinematography
 Abdurrahim Myftiu
 A selection of great Albanian movies offered by tanmarket.com (website in Albanian)
 History of the Albanian Cinema, a chronography from TheAlbanians.com (website in English)
 Albanian Film Database - Albanian films, cast, and crew
 Movie Movie - a chronological history of Albanian cinema from 1911 to the present day
 The Albanian Cinema Project - an initiative launched in 2012 by an international group of filmmakers, archivists and film scholars to help bring much needed attention to the cause of preserving, restoring and making accessible Albania's rich film legacy

References